Wiremu Greig (born 12 November 1999) is a New Zealand professional rugby league footballer who plays as a  for the Parramatta Eels in the NRL, and the New Zealand Māori at international level.

Background
Greig began his rugby league career playing for Northlands in the 2017 New Zealand Rugby League National Championships before being signed by the North Queensland Cowboys at age 17.

Playing career
Greig played for North Queensland in NYC in 2018 & 2019, featuring for Northern Pride and the Townsville Blackhawks in the Queensland Cup in 2019 and 2020. Greig was added the North Queensland development roster for the 2020 season, with COVID-19 pandemic causing Greig to only appear in 1 Queensland Cup game for the 2020 season. In 2021, Greig was a late inclusion for the Māori All Stars team versing the Indigenous All Stars in the 2021 NRL All Stars clash, coming off the bench in a 10–10 draw at Queensland Country Bank Stadium.

Greig was granted an immediate release from North Queensland, signing with the Parramatta Eels until the end of 2023. In round 6, 2021, Greig made his NRL debut for Parramatta against Canberra at GIO Stadium, coming off the bench in a 35-10 win.
Greig made one appearance for Parramatta in the 2022 NRL season which was against St. George Illawarra. Greig played off the bench in Parramatta's 48-14 victory.

References

External links
Parramatta Eels profile
North Queensland profile
All Stars profile

1999 births
Living people
Parramatta Eels players
New Zealand rugby league players
New Zealand emigrants to Australia
New Zealand Māori rugby league players
Northern Pride RLFC players
Rugby league players from Northland Region
Rugby league props
Townsville Blackhawks players